Elite Pro Basketball League (EPBL) is a professional franchise basketball league in India. Elite Pro Basketball Pvt Ltd was incorporated in February 2022 under the directorship of Sunny Bhandarkar and Pranav Prabhu. It is owned and operated by Elite Sports India (ESI).

Teams 

The league currently has sixteen franchised teams.

Try-outs 

EPBL's first try-out took place at Kotla Vijaya Bhaskara Reddy Indoor Stadium, Hyderabad on 12 May 2022. Over 250 basketball players took part in the try-out, and 150 players were selected by the twelve franchises which includes players from the Indian basketball team including Jagdeep Singh Bains, Pratham Singh, K. Ravikumar, Vinay Kaushik, Rachit Singh, Prakash Mishra and Arshdeep Singh.

Jaipur Giants has been acquired by Bradshaw Capital, an American company lead by former Montblanc USA CEO, Bill Brown.

Top players 

In June 2022 the league announced its first round of marquee player signings for some of the participating franchises.

Board members 

 Sunny Bhandarkar (CEO)
 David Pross (chief advisor)

See also 

 INBL
 3BL
 National Basketball Championship
 Sports in India
 West Asia Super League
 FIBA Asia Champions Cup

References 

Basketball competitions in India
Sports leagues in India
Professional sports leagues in India